"The Skipper’s Dream" is a Geordie folk song written in the 19th century by T. Moor, in a style deriving from music hall.

Even less is known about Moor than many of his counterparts. The only information available coming from a brief item in "Allan’s Tyneside Songs".Mr Moor, not even his Christian name is known, was a shoemaker who had a business in Denton Chare, Newcastle upon Tyne.

Lyrics 

T. Moor was a Tyneside singer/songwriter. The only song attributed to his name is "The Skipper’s Dream".
The Industrial Revolution in Great Britain in the early nineteenth century caused a shortage of labour, which in turn led to an influx of Irish families into England. This caused a certain amount of resentment, particularly in many places due to the families being of Roman Catholic religion. When this was coupled with the threat of invasion by Napoleon and the Roman Catholic French, it caused even more concern and led to a sudden and alarming increase in the number of Orange Lodges. This forced the government to legislate against the Order in 1825. 
The song is evidence of the Anti-Papish paranoia felt at the time on Tyneside where Orange lodges were particularly prevalent. 
In this song, a Tyneside skipper, having fallen into a drunken sleep, is tempted to 'turn Papist', with caustic comments about the forgiving of sins for money.

Comments on variations to the above version 

NOTE – 
In the early 19th century, as today, there were cheap books and magazines.
Many of these "chapbooks" were on poor-quality paper to a poor standard and with poor-quality print. The works were copied with no thoughts of copyright, and the work required very little proofreading, and what was done was not required to a high standard. Consequently, the dialect words of songs varied between editions.
This particular song shows several variations between the various published versions, some very minor, mainly in the spelling of the words, and sometimes variations within the same edition. Some of the most common are listed below :

  and about
  and count
 great and greet
 hanging and 
  and hep
  and keys
  and now
  and piece
  and priest
  and to
  and told
  and wakened

See also 
 Geordie dialect words

References

External links
 FARNE-Folk Archive Resource North East–The Skipper’s Dream
Allan’s Illustrated Edition of Tyneside songs and readings 1891

English folk songs
Songs related to Newcastle upon Tyne
1820s songs
Northumbrian folklore